The Terminal Hotel is a historic commercial building at Victory and Markham Streets in Little Rock, Arkansas.  It is a three-story Classical Revival brick building, set across Victory Street from Little Rock Union Station.  It was built in 1905 as a railroad hotel, and has since been converted into residential housing units.

The building was listed on the National Register of Historic Places in 1978.

See also
National Register of Historic Places listings in Little Rock, Arkansas

References

Hotel buildings on the National Register of Historic Places in Arkansas
Neoclassical architecture in Arkansas
Hotel buildings completed in 1905
Buildings and structures in Little Rock, Arkansas
Hotels in Arkansas
1905 establishments in Arkansas